Joseph Said (born 20 April 1954) is a former Maltese cyclist. He competed in the team time trial at the 1972 Summer Olympics.

References

External links
 

1954 births
Living people
Maltese male cyclists
Olympic cyclists of Malta
Cyclists at the 1972 Summer Olympics
Place of birth missing (living people)